The Imam Mahdi Islamic Education Center (IMIEC) of Baltimore is a mosque and Islamic education center in Baltimore County, Maryland, United States. It is located on 2406 Putty Hill Ave, Parkville, Maryland, 21234; the site was purchased in 2003 by donation of a local Muslim.

See also
  List of mosques in the Americas
  Lists of mosques 
  List of mosques in the United States
Islamic architecture
Islamic art
Islam in the United States

External links

References 

2003 establishments in Maryland
Baltimore County, Maryland landmarks
Iranian-American culture
Middle Eastern-American culture in Maryland
Mosques in Maryland
Parkville, Maryland
Religious buildings and structures in Baltimore County, Maryland
Shia Islam in the United States
Shia mosques in the United States